Corinna West (née Corinna Broz and also known as Corinna Broz-West ) is an American retired judoka and Olympian. She competed at the 1996 Olympics in Atlanta in the Women's 56 kg event.

In 1995, West was named "Outstanding Female Competitor" in the United States Judo Association's Hall of Fame.

References

External links 
 Art of the Olympians profile

Living people
American female judoka
Olympic judoka of the United States
Judoka at the 1996 Summer Olympics
Year of birth missing (living people)
21st-century American women
Pan American Games silver medalists for the United States
Judoka at the 1995 Pan American Games
Medalists at the 1995 Pan American Games
Pan American Games medalists in judo